Yeoward Addition is an unincorporated community in Whiteside County, Illinois, United States.

References

Unincorporated communities in Whiteside County, Illinois
Unincorporated communities in Illinois